This is a complete list of school divisions in the U.S. state of Virginia, organized by the regions into which the Virginia Department of Education groups them.

About school divisions 
Virginia's public K-12 schools are neither operated directly by the state government nor by special districts. Instead, most are organized as political subdivisions known as "school divisions" which are similar to school districts in some other states.

Each public school division is associated with one or more of the counties, independent cities and incorporated towns in Virginia, with major portions of their funding (and in many instances other services) provided through those local entities.

Each school division is overseen by a school board, whose members are either appointed by the elected officials of the participating local entities or by public elections. A Superintendent of Schools (Division Superintendent) is customarily the highest-ranking employee of a school division.

All listings are for city or county school divisions, except:

 The Williamsburg-James City County Public Schools, jointly administered by the City of Williamsburg and James City County, and
 The Colonial Beach and West Point school divisions, which are respectively associated with the incorporated towns of Colonial Beach and West Point.

The Fairfax County Public Schools, part of the government of Fairfax County, also serve the City of Fairfax under a contract between the city and county.

The Greensville County Public Schools also serve the City of Emporia.

Region 1 - Central Virginia

 Charles City County Public Schools 
 Chesterfield County Public Schools
 Colonial Heights Public Schools 
 Dinwiddie County Public Schools
 Goochland County Public Schools
 Hanover County Public Schools 
 Henrico County Public Schools
 Hopewell Public Schools
 New Kent County Public Schools 
 Petersburg City Public Schools
 Powhatan County Public Schools 
 Prince George County Public Schools 
 Richmond Public Schools
 Surry County Public Schools
 Sussex County Public Schools

Region 2 - Tidewater

 Accomack County Public Schools 
 Chesapeake Public Schools
 Franklin City Public Schools 
 Hampton City Schools 
 Isle of Wight County Public Schools
 Newport News Public Schools
 Norfolk Public Schools
 Northampton County Public Schools 
 Poquoson City Public Schools 
 Portsmouth Public Schools 
 Southampton County Public Schools 
 Suffolk City Public Schools
 Virginia Beach City Public Schools
 Williamsburg-James City County Public Schools
 York County School Division

Region 3 - Northern Neck

 Caroline County Public Schools 
 Colonial Beach Public Schools
 Essex County Public Schools
 Fredericksburg City Public Schools 
 Gloucester County Public Schools
 King and Queen County Public Schools 
 King George County Schools 
 King William County Public Schools
 Lancaster County Public Schools 
 Mathews County Public Schools 
 Middlesex County Public Schools 
 Northumberland County Public Schools 
 Richmond County Public Schools 
 Spotsylvania County Public Schools
 Stafford County Public Schools 
 West Point Public Schools 
 Westmoreland County Public Schools

Region 4 - Northern Virginia

 Alexandria City Public Schools
 Arlington County Public Schools
 Clarke County Public Schools 
 Culpeper County Public Schools
 Fairfax County Public Schools
 Falls Church City Public Schools
 Fauquier County Public Schools 
 Frederick County Public Schools
 Loudoun County Public Schools
 Madison County Public Schools 
 Manassas City Public Schools
 Manassas Park City Schools
 Orange County Public Schools 
 Page County Public Schools 
 Prince William County Public Schools
 Rappahannock County Public Schools 
 Shenandoah County Public Schools 
 Warren County Public Schools 
 Winchester Public Schools

Region 5 - Valley

 Albemarle County Public Schools
 Amherst County Public Schools 
 Augusta County Public Schools
 Bath County Public Schools 
 Bedford County Public Schools
 Buena Vista City Public Schools
 Campbell County Public Schools
 Charlottesville City Schools
 Fluvanna County Public Schools 
 Greene County Public Schools
 Harrisonburg City Public Schools
 Highland County Public Schools 
 Lexington City Schools 
 Louisa County Public Schools 
 Lynchburg City Schools
 Nelson County Public Schools 
 Rockbridge County Public Schools 
 Rockingham County Public Schools
 Staunton City Schools 
 Waynesboro Public Schools

Region 6 - Western Virginia

 Alleghany County Public Schools
 Botetourt County Public Schools
 Covington City Public Schools 
 Craig County Public Schools 
 Danville Public Schools 
 Floyd County Public Schools 
 Franklin County Public Schools 
 Henry County Public Schools
 Martinsville City Public Schools 
 Montgomery County Public Schools
 Patrick County Public Schools 
 Pittsylvania County Schools 
 Roanoke City Public Schools 
 Roanoke County Public Schools
 Salem City Schools

Region 7 - Southwest

 Bland County Public Schools 
 Bristol Virginia Public Schools 
 Buchanan County Public Schools
 Carroll County Public Schools 
 Dickenson County Public Schools
 Galax City Public Schools 
 Giles County Public Schools 
 Grayson County Public Schools 
 Lee County Public Schools 
 Norton City Schools 
 Pulaski County Public Schools
 Radford City Public Schools 
 Russell County Public Schools
 Scott County Public Schools 
 Smyth County Schools 
 Tazewell County Public Schools
 Washington County Public Schools 
 Wise County Public Schools
 Wythe County Public Schools

Region 8 - Southside

 Amelia County Public Schools 
 Appomattox County Public Schools
 Brunswick County Public Schools
 Buckingham County Public Schools 
 Charlotte County Public Schools 
 Cumberland County Public Schools
 Greensville County Public Schools
 Halifax County Public Schools
 Lunenburg County Public Schools
 Mecklenburg County Public Schools 
 Nottoway County Public Schools
 Prince Edward County Public Schools

See also 
 Governor's Schools (Virginia)

References

External links 
 List of school divisions from the Virginia Department of Education
 Commonwealth of Virginia Board of Education

School divisions
Virginia
School divisions